Teratoglaea is a genus of moths of the family Noctuidae.

Species
 Teratoglaea pacifica Sugi, 1958

References
Natural History Museum Lepidoptera genus database
Teratoglaea at funet

Cuculliinae